Tukam is an ethnic group in the Nuba Hills in South Kurdufan in Sudan. They speak the Tagoi language. The population of this group exceeds 10,000. Most or all members of this ethnic group are Muslims.

References
Joshua Project

Nuba peoples
Ethnic groups in Sudan